The 1964 Havering Council election took place on 7 May 1964 to elect members of Havering London Borough Council in London, England. The whole council was up for election and the council went into no overall control.

Background
These elections were the first to the newly formed borough. Previously elections had taken place in the Municipal Borough of Romford and Hornchurch Urban District. These boroughs and districts were joined to form the new London Borough of Havering by the London Government Act 1963.

A total of 146 candidates stood in the election for the 55 seats being contested across 20 wards. These included a full slate from the Labour party, while the Conservative and Liberal parties stood 44 and 19 respectively. Other candidates included 24 Independents and 4 Communists. There were 15 three-seat wards and 5 two-seat wards.

This election had aldermen as well as directly elected councillors.  Labour got 4 aldermen, the Conservatives 3 and Independents 2.

The Council was elected in 1964 as a "shadow authority" but did not start operations until 1 April 1965.

Election result
The results saw no party gain overall control of the new council with Labour winning 27 and the Conservatives winning 16 of the 55 seats. Overall turnout in the election was 40.9%. This turnout included 713 postal votes.

|}

Ward results

References

1964
1964 London Borough council elections